Albertis may refer to:
 Albertis Castle, home of Captain Enrico Alberto d'Albertis in Genoa, Italy
 D'Albertis Junction, located at the confluence of Ok Tedi River with the Fly River downstream from Kiunga, Papua New Guinea
 Albertis S. Harrison, Jr. (1907–1995), governor of Virginia from 1962 to 1966
 G.S.D. Bogliasco D'Albertis, an Italian football club from 1950 to 2013
 Carlo Alberto D'Albertis (1906–1983), Italian Olympic sailor
 D'Albertis' ringtail possum (Pseudochirops albertisii), a species of marsupial in the family Pseudocheiridae
 Enrico Alberto d'Albertis (1846–1932), Italian navigator, writer, philologist, ethnologist and philanthropist
 Luigi D'Albertis (1841–1901), flamboyant Italian naturalist and explorer

See also
 Alberti (disambiguation)
 Alberti (surname)